The 1983 Masters (also known as the 1983 Volvo Masters for sponsorship reasons) was held in Madison Square Garden in New York City between 10 January and 15 January 1984. It was the year-end championship of the 1983 Volvo Grand Prix tour.

Finals

Singles

 John McEnroe defeated  Ivan Lendl, 6–3, 6–4, 6–4

Doubles

 Peter Fleming /  John McEnroe  defeated  Pavel Složil /  Tomáš Šmíd 6–2, 6–2

References

 
Volvo Masters
Grand Prix tennis circuit year-end championships
Tennis tournaments in the United States
Volvo Masters
Volvo Masters
Volvo Masters